Sven Felski (born November 18, 1974 in East Berlin, East Germany) is a German ice hockey coach and executive and retired German professional ice hockey winger. He played for Eisbären Berlin of the Deutsche Eishockey Liga (DEL). He was induced into the German ice hockey Hall of Fame in 2015.

Playing career 
Felski began his professional career with Eisbären in 1992, and remained with the team his entire career until he retired in 2012. He captured six German championships and the 2010 European Trophy with the Eisbären squad. He was selected to the DEL All-Star game in 2003, 2005, 2006, 2007, 2008, and 2009.

Felski represented the German national team at the 1993 and 1994 World Junior Ice Hockey Championships, the 1998, 1999, 2001, 2003, 2005, 2006, 2007, and 2009 Ice Hockey World Championships, and the 2006 Winter Olympics and 2010 Winter Olympics.

Coaching career 
In August 2015, Felski was named head coach of the German U17 national team. He has been serving as sport director of Eisbären Juniors Berlin e.V. since May 2016.

Career statistics

Regular season and playoffs

International

External links

References 

1974 births
German ice hockey left wingers
Eisbären Berlin players
Ice hockey people from Berlin
Ice hockey players at the 2006 Winter Olympics
Ice hockey players at the 2010 Winter Olympics
Living people
Olympic ice hockey players of Germany
Recipients of the Order of Merit of Berlin